Söderlund is a Swedish surname. Notable people with the surname include:

Åke Söderlund (1925–2002), Swedish racewalker
Alexander Søderlund (born 1987), Norwegian football player
Arne Söderlund, South African Navy officer and author
Carl Söderlund (born 1997), Swedish tennis player
Curt Söderlund (born 1945), Swedish cyclist
Erik Söderlund (1925–2009), Swedish racewalker, twin brother of Åke
Helene Söderlund (born 1987), Swedish ski-orienteering competitor 
Jezper Söderlund (born 1980), Swedish record producer and electronic music artist
Jonas Söderlund (born 1971), Swedish organizational theorist
Marcus Söderlund, Swedish music video, commercial and documentary director
Mats Söderlund (born 1967),  Swedish musician
Michael Söderlund (born 1962), Swedish swimmer 
Patrick Söderlund (born 1973), Swedish businessman
Robbin Söderlund (born 1987), Swedish DJ and music producer
Tim Söderlund (born 1998), Swedish ice hockey player
Ulla-Britt Söderlund (1943–1985), Swedish costume designer

Swedish-language surnames